1739 Meyermann, provisional designation , is a stony Florian asteroid from the inner regions of the asteroid belt, approximately 7.5 kilometers in diameter. It was discovered by German astronomer Karl Reinmuth at Heidelberg Observatory on 15 August 1939. It was later named in memory of astronomer Bruno Meyermann.

Orbit and classification 

Meyermann is a member of the Flora family, a large group of S-type asteroids in the inner main-belt. It orbits the Sun at a distance of 2.0–2.5 AU once every 3 years and 5 months (1,242 days). Its orbit has an eccentricity of 0.12 and an inclination of 3° with respect to the ecliptic.

Rotation period 

Two rotational lightcurves of Meyermann were obtained from photometric observations taken by Czech astronomer Petr Pravec at Ondřejov Observatory in 2007 and 2014. They gave a rotation period of 2.8212 and 2.8219 hours with a brightness variation of 0.12 and 0.17 magnitude, respectively.

Diameter and albedo 

According to the refitted 2014-results from the survey carried out by the Wide-field Infrared Survey Explorer with its NEOWISE missions, Meyermann measures 7.858 kilometers in diameter, and its surface has an albedo of 0.254. The Collaborative Asteroid Lightcurve Link assumes an albedo of 0.24 – derived from 8 Flora, the largest member and namesake of its family – and calculates a diameter of 7.47 kilometers based on an absolute magnitude of 12.8.

Naming 

This minor planet was named in memory of Bruno Meyermann (1876–1963), a classical astronomer and academic teacher at Göttingen Observatory in Lower Saxony, Germany. His fields of interest included polar motion and relativistic effects. The official  was published by the Minor Planet Center on 18 April 1977.

Notes

References

External links 
 Asteroid Lightcurve Database (LCDB), query form (info )
 Dictionary of Minor Planet Names, Google books
 Asteroids and comets rotation curves, CdR – Observatoire de Genève, Raoul Behrend
 Discovery Circumstances: Numbered Minor Planets (1)-(5000) – Minor Planet Center
 
 

001739
Discoveries by Karl Wilhelm Reinmuth
Named minor planets
19390815